Bickford Slides is a  waterfall in the town of Stow, Maine, United States. Located on Bickford Brook within the White Mountain National Forest's Caribou-Speckled Mountain Wilderness, it consists of two tiers of cascades and slides, the upper tier 40 feet high and the lower tier 50 feet high.

Sources

Waterfalls of Maine
Landforms of Oxford County, Maine
Tourist attractions in Oxford County, Maine
Tiered waterfalls